Carsten Bergemann (born 24 January 1979, in Bautzen) is a German track cyclist, specialising in the sprint disciplines. Bergemann was world champion as part of the Germany team in team sprint in 2003.

Major results

External links 

1979 births
Living people
People from Bautzen
People from Bezirk Dresden
German track cyclists
German male cyclists
Cyclists from Saxony
Olympic cyclists of Germany
Cyclists at the 2004 Summer Olympics
Cyclists at the 2008 Summer Olympics
UCI Track Cycling World Champions (men)